The 2013 ICC Awards were broadcast in a special TV show which was aired on 14 December 2013. The ICC had been hosting ICC Awards since 2004, which were now into their tenth year. Previous events were held in London (2004, 2011), Sydney (2005), Mumbai (2006), Johannesburg (2007, 2009), Dubai (2008), Bangalore (2010) and Colombo (2012). The ICC awards the Sir Garfield Sobers Trophy to the Cricketer of the Year, which is considered to be the most prestigious award in world cricket.

Selection Committee
Chaired by ICC Cricket Hall of Famer Anil Kumble, the ICC Selection Committee was charged with two main tasks. Using their experience, knowledge and appreciation of the game, they selected the ICC World XI Teams and provided a long list of nominations to the 32 members of the voting academy to cast their votes in the individual player award categories.

Selection Committee members:

 Anil Kumble (chairman)
 Alec Stewart
 Catherine Campbell
 Waqar Younis
 Graeme Pollock

Award categories and winners

Cricketer of the Year

 Michael Clarke

Test Player of the Year

 Michael Clarke

ODI Player of the Year

 Kumar Sangakkara

Twenty20 International Performance of the Year
 Umar Gul, for taking 5/6 from 2.2 overs against South Africa at Centurion Park in Centurion on 3 March 2013

Emerging Player of the Year

 Cheteshwar Pujara

Associate Player of the Year
 Kevin O'Brien

Umpire of the Year

 Richard Kettleborough

Women's ODI Cricketer of the Year
 Suzie Bates

Women's T20I Cricketer of the Year
 Sarah Taylor

Spirit of Cricket
 Mahela Jayawardene, for his honesty at a very crucial stage of the first Test match against New Zealand at Galle International Stadium in Galle on 18 November 2012

LG People's Choice Award
 MS Dhoni

ICC World XI Teams

ICC Test Team of the Year

Alastair Cook was selected as the captain of the Test Team of the Year, with MS Dhoni selected as the wicket-keeper. Other players are:

 Alastair Cook
 Cheteshwar Pujara
 Hashim Amla
 Michael Clarke
 Michael Hussey
 AB de Villiers
 MS Dhoni
 Graeme Swann
 Dale Steyn
 James Anderson
 Vernon Philander
 Ravichandran Ashwin (12th man)

ICC ODI Team of the Year

For the third time consecutively, MS Dhoni was selected as both captain and wicket-keeper of the ODI Team of the Year. Other players are:

 Tillakaratne Dilshan
 Shikhar Dhawan
 Hashim Amla
 Kumar Sangakkara
 AB de Villiers
 MS Dhoni
 Ravindra Jadeja
 Saeed Ajmal
 Mitchell Starc
 James Anderson
 Lasith Malinga
 Mitchell McClenaghan (12th man)

Short lists

Cricketer of the Year
 Hashim Amla
 James Anderson
 Michael Clarke
 Alastair Cook
 MS Dhoni
 Kumar Sangakkara

Test Player of the Year
 Hashim Amla
 James Anderson
 Ravichandran Ashwin
 Michael Clarke
 Cheteshwar Pujara
 Dale Steyn

ODI Player of the Year
 Saeed Ajmal
 Shikhar Dhawan
 MS Dhoni
 Misbah-ul-Haq
 Ravindra Jadeja
 Kumar Sangakkara

Twenty20 International Performance of the Year
 Umar Gul
 Martin Guptill
 Brendon McCullum
 Ajantha Mendis

Emerging Player of the Year
 Trent Boult
 Cheteshwar Pujara
 Joe Root
 Mitchell Starc

Associate Player of the Year
 Kevin O'Brien
 Kyle Coetzer
 Ed Joyce
 Nawroz Mangal

Umpire of the Year
 Aleem Dar
 Steve Davis
 Kumar Dharmasena
 Marais Erasmus
 Ian Gould
 Tony Hill
 Richard Illingworth
 Richard Kettleborough
 Nigel Llong
 Bruce Oxenford
 Paul Reiffel
 Rod Tucker

Women's ODI Cricketer of the Year
 Suzie Bates
 Charlotte Edwards
 Meg Lanning
 Dane van Niekerk
 Anya Shrubsole
 Stafanie Taylor

Women's T20I Cricketer of the Year
 Suzie Bates
 Shanel Daley
 Deandra Dottin
 Meg Lanning
 Sarah Taylor
 Stafanie Taylor

See also

 International Cricket Council
 ICC Awards
 Sir Garfield Sobers Trophy (Cricketer of the Year)
 ICC Test Player of the Year
 ICC ODI Player of the Year
 David Shepherd Trophy (Umpire of the Year)
 ICC Women's Cricketer of the Year
 ICC Test Team of the Year
 ICC ODI Team of the Year

References

International Cricket Council awards and rankings
Crick
ICC Awards